The Standard may refer to:

Entertainment
 The Standard (band), an indie rock band from Portland, Oregon
 The Standard (novel), a 1934 novel by the Austrian writer Alexander Lernet-Holenia
 The Standard (Tommy Flanagan album), 1980
 The Standard (Take 6 album), 2008
 The Standard (TV series), a series produced by BBC Scotland in 1978
 The Standard, a TV program broadcast by CHNU-DT

Newspapers
 The Standard, original name of the Evening Standard, founded in London in 1827
 The Standard (Hong Kong), an English free newspaper in Hong Kong
 The Standard (Kenya), one of the largest newspapers in Kenya
 The Standard (Montreal), a national weekly newspaper published in Canada from 1905 until 1951
 The Standard (Philippines), or The Manila Standard, a daily newspaper in the Philippines
 The Port Melbourne Standard, earlier The Standard (Port Melbourne), a defunct Australian weekly
 St. Catharines Standard has a masthead name of The Standard, a daily newspaper published in St. Catharines, Ontario since 1891

 The Standard (Zimbabwe), a weekly newspaper in Zimbabwe
 The Standard (Warrnambool), a newspaper published six days a week in Warrnambool, Victoria, Australia

Other
 The Standard, Copenhagen, a jazz club and restaurant complex
 The Standard, East Village, a hotel in New York City
 The Standard, High Line, a hotel in New York City
 thestandard.com, new website
 Standard Hotels, hotel chain

See also 
 De Standaard, a Belgian newspaper
 Der Standard, an Austrian newspaper
 Evening Standard, a British newspaper, founded as The Standard
 The Weekly Standard, an American neoconservative magazine, sometimes abbreviated The Standard
 American Standard (disambiguation)
 Standard (disambiguation)
 Standard American English (disambiguation)